Fly on the wall is a style of documentary-making used in film and television production. The name derived from the idea that events are seen candidly, as a fly on a wall might see them. In the purest form of fly-on-the-wall documentary-making, the camera crew works as unobtrusively as possible; however, it is also common for participants to be interviewed, often by an off-camera voice.

Decades before structured reality shows became popular, the BBC had broadcast fly-on-the-wall film Royal Family (a 1969 documentary produced in association with ITV), while 1974's The Family, is said to be the earliest example of a reality TV docusoap on the BBC. In the late 1990s, Chris Terrill's docusoap series The Cruise made a star of singer and TV personality Jane McDonald, while Welsh cleaner Maureen Rees became popular after her appearances on BBC One's Driving School.

Other British examples include Dynamo: Magician Impossible and Channel 4's  Educating... series, while in the United States popular examples include American Factory, Cops, Deadliest Catch, Big Brother and Weiner, a film about a political sex scandal which developed during a mayoral election in New York.

See also
 Cinéma vérité
 Direct cinema
 Reality television
 Television documentary

References

Documentary film styles